Korean swords have served a central place in the defense of the nation for thousands of years. Although typical Korean land battles have taken place in wide valleys and narrow mountain passes, which favor use of the spear and bow, the sword found use as a secondary, close-quarters weapon, especially useful during sieges and ship-to-ship boarding actions. Higher quality, ceremonial swords were typically reserved for the officer corps as a symbol of authority with which to command the troops. Ceremonial swords are still granted to military officials by the civilian authority to this day.

Korean swords typically fall into two broad categories, the Geom, and the Do. The Geom is a double-edged weapon, while the Do is a single-edged weapon; although exceptions exist. In common parlance, all swords may be referred to as Geom (Korean:검; 劍). 

The history of the sword in Korea begins with bronze daggers of Bronze Age of which existing artifacts dates back to 10-9th millennium BCE. Iron use co-existed with Bronze use during the late Bronze Age. As Bronze Age and Iron Age started at the same time in the Japanese archipelago during the Yayoi period, use of Iron in the Korean Cultural sphere can be generalized to have started in the same time period. 

The rarity of traditional Korean swords makes them extremely valuable, and in high demand for museums and collectors.

History

Early swords

Evidence of sword production dates to the transitional Late Bronze to Early Iron Age (c. 1st century BC), with an 
earthenware mold for a Bronze Sword found in South Gyeongsang Province.

The earliest Korean sword type is the so-called Hwandudaedo or "ring-pommel sword," prevalent during the 1st to 6th centuries. Until the 3rd century, these swords were very rare and presumably reserved for royalty. They became more attainable in the later 4th and during the 5th century, and are found in many higher class tombs of this period. Their production declined in the 6th century.

By the last third of the Three Kingdoms period (i.e. 450 AD and beyond), steel making techniques had come from China (possibly during the Southern and Northern Dynasties period in China) and were also employed in Korean swordmaking by all three Korean kingdoms (Goguryeo, Baekje, and Silla). In 2013, a Chinese Character inscription was discovered on a 5th-century sword from the  Geumgwanchong tomb in Gyeongju, North Gyeongsang Province.
The  scabbard of the sword has the inscription  尒斯智王 Yisaji-wang ("King Isaji").

Long swords during the Korean Three Kingdoms period were used primarily by cavalry and commanders (who were also usually mounted), not infantry. At this time land warfare consisted mostly of spearmen and bowmen on foot, mounted archers on horseback using two-handed bows, and mounted swordsmen with twin blades. Swords were not a primary weapon for all combat but were instead used mostly for shock attacks, defensive strokes, and for close-in fighting. Blades were heavy as they were made mostly of bronze and later iron, and pommels were often knobbed and used as balances or for very close-in work. Short swords may have been used in follow-up attacks, as short sword carriers were heavily armored.

During the Goryeo dynasty, a limited number of Korean swords were exported for trade missions in Asia. It is likely that Korean swordmaking was influenced by Mongol and Chinese weapon manufacture after Goryeo's submission as a Mongol vassal after 6 Mongol invasions ending in 1259.

Joseon period 

The Joseon period (15th to 19th centuries) is the "classical" era of Korean culture, including the creation of a national script and the suppression of Korean Buddhism in favour of Neo-Confucianism. Accompanying the neo-Confucian philosophies was an increased emphasis on the artistic, literary, and academic pursuits, while martial pursuits and training (still understood to be necessary) declined in cultural stature.

Korean swords were in production mostly for military and ceremonial use; private ownership outside of these purposes was largely restricted to members of the wealthy and/or politically influential classes, and possession by commoners often drew the suspicion of the authorities. Several types of ceremonial swords were made; among these sword types are the jingeom (dragon sword) and ingeom (tiger sword), which by tradition could be forged only at certain times. The highest grade of these, sa-ingeom (four tigers sword) and possibly the sa-jingeom (four dragons sword - none are extant) were reserved for the monarch and could only be made during a window of 2 hours every 12 years. The lower-grade swords - i-jingeom, sam-jingeom, i-ingeom, sam-ingeom (two dragons, three dragons, two tigers, three tigers) - could be made more frequently.

As only high-quality steel was considered for use in forging military swords, the quantity produced by Korean blacksmiths, even for Korea's own military, was limited (most Korean infantry used spears, tridents, and ranged weaponry such as the crossbow and composite bow, while swords were usually wielded by officers, local magistrates/deputies, and mounted soldiers). In addition, because Korean weapons manufacture was typically dedicated to the production of weapons for military/government use and under close scrutiny by government authorities, it was not uncommon for Koreans (both military personnel and civilians) to import swords, usually from Japan's renowned swordsmiths, in the event that Korean sources could not be secured.

Among the swords that were produced in Korea for use by its military and law enforcement officials include the jedok geom and bonguk geom (these refer to both a style of sword as well as a style of bladed combat). Blades were single-edged and usually between 3–4 feet long; however, certain swords of the jedok geom style could reach a length of 6 feet (while it is unclear as to the style of the swords of Admiral Yi Sun-shin, he is believed to have wielded swords that were almost that size).

During the Imjin War (1592-1598), under the influence of Japanese swords, Hwandos with blades with a length of 90 cm or more appeared.

The saingeom is a type of Joseon-era sword from Western Korea. It has a 90 centimeter (35-inch) blade, produced primarily by molding rather than hammering.

Typology

Introduction 
Geom (검; 劍) is the Korean word for "sword;" it is typically used of double-edged swords, but is also applied to single-edged swords. Yedo (예도; 銳刀) is the specific term for a single-edged sword.

Elements of the Korean sword include: geomjip or scabbard, most often of lacquer; hyuljo or fuller (most genuine Korean swords didn't have a fuller); hwando magi or collar; ho in or collar; kodeungi or hand guard; a ring-design pommel; tassels; a round and wide designed sword guard, or a straight lotus design.

Various examples of Korean sword design 
Many different types of Do and Geom exist, ranging from very simple forms found in many nations, to very unique and artistic designs found solely in Korea.

 Jikdo, literally "straight sword."
 Janggeom (장검; 長劍): literally "long sword."
 Jingum, literally "true sword." Typically used to signify a blade that is meant for combat, rather than for ceremonial or spiritual purposes.
 Changpogeom, a sword named after the calamus plant (changpo in Korean). The sword is designed to reflect the design of the plant, with a double sided blade tapering to a narrow tip.
 Hwandudaedo (환두대도; 環頭大刀) or "ring-pommel sword) is a type of single-edged sword used during the Three Kingdoms era.
Geom is the generic term for "sword," but more specifically also refers to a  shorter straight-blade, double-edged sword with a somewhat blunted tip which distinguishes this weapon from its Chinese counterpart, the jian. As a badge of status rather than a weapon, the Geom was often heavily decorated both on its scabbard and grip as well as with engravings and inscriptions on its blade.
Do, commonly referred to as a Hwando or "military sword," was a single-edged sword, used as a sidearm for the Korean soldier well into the 19th century. Sometimes referred to as a "short sword," relative to the larger sized two-handed Sangsoodo, its length of 24 to 34 inches was comparable to that of the two-handed Japanese Katana which may have been the inspiration for the Ssangsoodo. Reports found in the "Book of Corrections," a Korean record of the Imjin Warum (1592–1598), state that Japanese swords taken in combat were readily pressed into service by simply trimming the length of the hilt. Forged of carbon steel the Do has a single-edged, curved blade, a sword guard, and a grip typically of wood. Earlier practice saw the Do suspended from a cord (Jul) and with a simple metal hanger which allowed the soldier to speedily discard his sheath. In later practice, the sword was suspended from a girdle or belt but retained a simple metal quick-release clip.
The  Ssangsudo (쌍수도; 雙手刀) is a double-handed single-edged sword used for a limited time in the late 16th and early 17th centuries. Chinese literature and history both ascribe its adoption as a weapon on the Asian mainland to General Qi Jiguang (1528–1588) who is said to have taken Wokou pirate prisoners during his campaigns in Southern China. Qi Jiguang wrote about the sword in his manual the Record of Military Training or Lianbing Shi Ji (練兵實紀) and recommended its use as part of the defense along China's northern border. Since General Qi's other famous training manual, the Jixiao Xinshu (紀效新書), was used in the revamping of the Korean Military it followed that this weapon came highly recommended. Nor did the Koreans overlook that oversized swords had been used by Japanese soldiers during the recent conflict as well as during their own experiences with the Wakou. Intended by General Qi to be carried into combat on wagons or by individuals who drew each other's weapon, the Ssangsoodo measured an overall length of six feet, two feet of which were to be the grip and another two feet forward of the handle to be sheathed in brass or copper. Undoubtedly the length and weight of the sword, and the high level of training necessary to wield it, made the sword impractical as a common part of the Korean arsenal. It is also useful to note that the Ming Dynasty, which saw this weapon added to its own military, fell to Manchu invaders some 50 years later.
The  Hyup Do or  "spear sword" is found in Book Three, Chapter seven. Though commonly taken for a polearm after the fashion of the Japanese Naginata, the text of the Muyedobotongji relates that "the handle is about four feet....weighs about four pounds.....the illustration in this book is corrected according to the Mubiji and the Japanese Jang Do. They are the same." It is reasonable to conclude that the Hyup Do was much closer to the Japanese Nagamaki.

 
The *Woldo (월도; 月刀) was a bladed polearm, like its Chinese counterpart the Yaoyindao commonly decorated with a tassel or feather affixed to a prominence on the spine of the blade which assisted the person wielding the weapon with identifying the blade's center of mass. According to the Muyedobotongji, "the length of the handle is six feet, four inches; the length of the blade is two feet eight inches. The weight is about three pounds, fifteen ounces."
Ssangdo or Ssanggeom (쌍도; 雙刀; 쌍검: 雙劍) This literally means "Twin Swords." It can vary from twin long swords or twin short swords. These techniques can also be used on horseback as 'Masang ssanggeom.' The Korean cavalry was famous for using Twin Sword techniques on horseback, while balancing on the horse with grace. Ssangyunggeom are twin swords which are carried in a single scabbard. The sheath is twice as wide because it needs room for the second sword. The sword's length varies from three to four feet. Usually these swords were double-edged and made entirely of Iron (including the scabbard).
Hyeopdo (협도; 俠刀) This is also a large crescent blade that is similar to the 'Pudao' but wider and thicker. A tassle is attached to the end of the blade.
Hwando (환도): This is a single-edged short sword which was strictly used with one hand. This was a common sidearm for many soldiers during the Joseon era.
Unggeom (웅검): This is a single-edged long sword that was used with one or two hands. This was another common side arm for many soldiers during the Joseon era.
Samgakdo (삼각도; 三角刀): The samgakdo is a recently used terminology for swords used for mat cutting. The cross section of the sword is triangular in shape; hence the name Samgakdo (which means three-sided sword).
For martial arts students learning sword forms or Geombeop/Geomsul, practice wood swords or mokgeom are most often used; then those made out of carbonized bamboo or Juk-do; lastly compression sponge, single or double-edged, with or without blood grooves. Modern sword and knife sparring commonly makes use of plastic blades.
Chilseonggeom (칠성검; 七星劍): The name of this sword translates as "seven star sword" and it could be either single-edged or double-edged. It is primarily known for its use by Buddhist practitioners. Almost all of these swords had constellation engravings on the blades (usually the Big Dipper, although depiction of any 7 star cluster isn't uncommon).
Sainchamsageom: This sword's name literally means 'Great Four Tiger Sword.' This is a ceremonial sword that is used for demon slaying and Shamanistic rituals. The ingeom (Tiger Swords) were usually of the same designs but of different strengths. They were all made according to the Year, Month, Week, Day, and Hour of the Tiger. Other examples include the sam-ingeom or 'Three Tiger Sword,' and the i-ingeom or 'Two Tiger Sword.'
Samjeongdo (삼정도; 三精刀) the sword given to newly promoted Korean military generals each year by the Ministry of National Defense.
 The Seven-Branched Sword is a peculiar specimen forged in Baekje in the order of the king. There is a theory that this is a sword that was to be a gift presented to the emperor of Japan. There was no handle found for the blade nor was there a scabbard found for it while it was being excavated.

Korean swordsmanship

The study of Korean sword as a weapons system is commonly called Geom Beop (literally "Sword Law")

During the Joseon period, swords also had ranks depending on who wielded them and what their purpose was. The highest ranking of these swords was known as the  Byeol-ungeom (별운검: 別雲劍), literally meaning "cloud-splitting sword." Only two such swords existed and were wielded by the King's two bodyguards, who always stood on either side of him and held the nobility title of Un'geom (운검: 雲劍). 

Master swordsmen
General Kim Yushin, was said to have been given an engraved sword and sacred books by the gods, and helped to unify Korea under Silla. His most famous son, Kim Wonsul, was a noted swordsman who fought against the Tang Dynasty armies in the late Three Kingdoms period.
Cheok Jun-Gyeong was a civil official and swordsman of Goryeo who became famous for his feats in the Jurchen Invasion of 1104. 
Baek Dong Soo was a swordsman and martial artist who became a folk hero when his group protected King Jeongjo from assassination attempts. His most notable work, Muyedobotongji (illustrated manual of Korean martial arts).

Contemporary swords

Only by the mid-1990s did Korean swordmaking come back to expert levels comparable to the Joseon era.
Haedong jingeom (해동진검; 海東陣劍) This literally means 'East Asian Practical Sword' is the neologistic term for current-day swords for "revivals" of Korean swordsmanship.

Sword ownership in Korea is currently restricted (private weapons ownership was culturally frowned upon and largely restricted during other times in Korean history, particularly during the Joseon era and the Japanese occupation period - albeit for different reasons in either period), and there are very few traditional sword collectors in Korea today. General/flag-grade officers are given dress swords upon assuming command in the Republic of Korea (ROK) army. Despite restrictions on sword ownership and a lingering social preference against armed martial arts (dating at least to the Joseon era), practical sword fighting is enjoying a small revival amongst elite military regiments, and fencing is once again attracting interest in Korean universities.

Sword producers
Hong Seok-hyeon in Paju, Gyeonggi province, makes swords by hand.
Lee Sang Seon in Munkyong City, Kyongsangbukdo Province
Lee Eun-cheul in Yeoju, Kyonggi Province 
Kang Cheul Kyu in Pocheon, Kyongki Province

In Korean popular culture
Korean historical action films have elements of swordsmanship within them. Important recent films readily available (and subtitle in Chinese/English) include:

Musa The Warrior, 2001, 130 minutes, joint Korean/Chinese production
Chung Doo-Hong martial arts director. Set in the Goryeo dynasty, during 1375 chronicles General Choi Jung's mission to the Ming to make peace during their wars against the Yuan.
Sword in the Moon, 2003
A Korean production that is a variant of Taegukgi: The Brotherhood of War. This is set in the Three Kingdoms of Korea period where there were various uprisings in the military and many assassination attempts on the King.
Shadowless Sword, 2005
Duelist, 2005
Blades of Blood, 2010

Authentic reproductions

In 2006, swords bestowed on newly promoted brigadier generals were changed from the single-edged curved ‘’samjeongdo’’, which was considered to be a traditional Korean sword, to the double-edged straight ‘’samjeong-geom‘’ claiming that the ‘’samjeongdo’’ is similar to the “Western sword” and not reflecting the traditional Korean sword. ‘’Samjeongdo’’ had been given to brigadier generals since 1983.

In November 2015, the Statue of Admiral Yi Sun-Shin erected in Parliament was replaced with a newly created authentic statue. The sword of the statue was longer than the traditional Korean sword and more resembled the Japanese sword.

See also
Korean swordsmanship
Korean knife
Kumdo
Hwandudaedo
Saingeom
Korean spears
Japanese sword
Indian sword
Chinese sword

References

External links

Swords of Korea
한국의 칼
Stone Swords (click on 유물보기 for pictures)
Bronze Swords (click on 유물보기 for pictures)
Swords with Ring Pommel (click on 유물보기 for pictures)
Joseon Period Swords (click on 유물보기 for pictures)
전통도검
Ancient Swords of Korea
한국의 칼 특별전 (includes a video of Korean swords)

Blade weapons
Weapons of Korea
Swords

Traditional Korean weapons